Port Shoreham  is a small community in the Canadian province of Nova Scotia, in the Municipality of the District of Guysborough in Guysborough County.

Communities in Guysborough County, Nova Scotia
General Service Areas in Nova Scotia